Alaa Maso (born 1 January 2000) is a Syrian swimmer.

He competed at the 2020 Summer Olympics for the Refugee Olympic Team, taking part in the men's 50m freestyle. His brother Mohamad Maso competed for Syria in the men's triathlon at the 2020 Olympics, coming 47th. The brothers embraced during the Parade of Nations in the opening ceremony. The two brothers left Syria as refugees in 2015 and settled in Germany in 2016.

References

External links
Profile at olympics.com

2000 births
Living people 
Swimmers at the 2020 Summer Olympics
Refugee Olympic Team at the 2020 Summer Olympics
Sportspeople from Aleppo
21st-century Syrian people